The 2020 DStv Mzansi Viewers' Choice Awards were the 3rd annual DStv Magic Viewers Choice Awards that took place on March 14, 2020, at the Ticketpro Dome in Johannesburg. The event recognized the biggest achievements in television, radio, music, sports, and comedy in South Africa.

Winners and Nominees 
The nominations were announced on 28 November 2019, at the Multichoice Magic City in Randburg, Johannesburg.

Favourite Personality of the Year 
Bonang Matheba
 Somizi Mhlongo
 Anele Mdoda
 Nomzamo Mbatha
 Sho Madjozi

Favourite Song of the Year 
Prince Kaybee (featuring Indlovukazi, Supta and Afro Brotherz) – "Gugulethu"
 Kabza De Small, DJ Maphorisa and Njelic – "Nana Thula"
 Sjava – "Umama"
 Nasty C (featuring Rowlene) – "SMA"
 Kaygee DaKing & Bizizi (featuring Killer Kau) – "Kokota"

Favourite TV Presenter 
Moshe Ndiki
Nomsa Buthelezi

Favourite comedian 
Siyanda Maphumulo
Celeste Ntuli
Skhumba Hlope

Favourite Rising Star 
Kabza De Small
 Wiseman Mncube
 Simthandile ‘SimTiger’ Tshabalala
 Thato Moeng
 Larona Moagi

Favourite Radio Personality 
 DJ Fresh
 Kgomotso Matsunyane
 Siphiwo ‘Spitch’ Nzawumbi
 Seipati ‘Twasa’ Seoke
Khathide ‘Tshatha’ Ngobe

Favourite Actor 
 Molefi Monaisa
 Bheki Sibiya
 Presley Chweneyagae
Warren Masemola
 Masoja Msiza

Favourite Actress 
Sindi Dlathu
 Dawn Thandeka King
 Zola Nombona
 Florence Masebe
 Tsholofelo Matshaba

Favourite Music Artist/Group 
 King Monada won

Favourite DJ 
Kabza De Small
 DJ Maphorisa
 DJ Speedsta
 DJ Sumbody

Favourite Sports Personality 
Siya Kolisi
 Thembi Kgatlana
 Percy Tau
 Bongiwe Msomi
 Refiloe Jane

Ultimate Viewers' Choice Award 
Khathide "Tshatha" Ngobe

References 

South African television awards
South African music awards
2020 awards
2020 in South African television